Building a Better  is the fourth full-length album by Illinois indie rock band Park. It was released in 2006.

The fourth word of the album's title is written in a similar style to that used in Mad Libs, as a blank with the word (noun) under it. This has led to some confusion on how to pronounce the title out loud. Frontman Ladd Mitchell has said they just refer to it as "Building..." or "Building a Better". The working title for the album had been "Building a Better Pirate", but the band changed it to a blank as they felt it was too whimsical.  On July 22, 2008 Vega Vinyl released "Building A Better __" on vinyl.  An acoustic b-side entitled "Eraser" was later released online.

The album was the bands third on Lobster Records, and was the last album before the band's hiatus, which lasted until 2013.

Ladd Mitchell was the primary songwriter for the album. According to a lyric feature written by Ladd Mitchell for Euphonia Online, the album's lyrical content came from personal experiences of Mitchell such as relationships and dreams.

Track listing

Personnel
 Ladd Mitchell – Vocals, Guitar, Keys
 Justin Valenti – Guitar
 Alex Haycraft – Bass, Backing Vocals
 Miles Logan – Percussion
 Peter Munters – Additional Vocals
 Jody Pollock – Additional Vocals

References

2006 albums
Lobster Records albums
Park (band) albums
Articles with underscores in the title